Hydroglyphus flammulatus, is a species of predaceous diving beetle found in India, Sri Lanka, Pakistan, Thailand, Cambodia, China, Taiwan, Korea, Myanmar, Bangladesh, Indonesia, Vietnam, and Nepal.

Description
Typical length is about 2.4 mm. Fourth segment of the protarsi and mesotarsi are much reduced, and hardly visible. Prosternal process is arched and oblique. Latero-basal plica on pronotum not continued on elytra. Scutellum is not visible. The sutural striae in elytra are complete but less distinctly carved. Elytral striae and a transverse groove behind the eyes are missing.

References 

Dytiscidae
Insects of Sri Lanka
Insects described in 1882